Nick Brossette (born March 2, 1996) is a former American football running back. He played college football at LSU. He played for the DC Defenders of the XFL in 2020.

Early years
Brossette was a 4-star recruit from University High School in Baton Rouge, Louisiana. He committed to LSU on August 23, 2013.

College career
During his freshman, sophomore, and junior seasons, Brossette did not see much playing time due to competition from Leonard Fournette and Derrius Guice. During his senior season, he ran for 1,039 yards and 14 touchdowns.

Professional career

New England Patriots

After going undrafted in the 2019 NFL Draft, the Patriots signed him as an undrafted free agent on April 29, 2019. During his preseason debut against the Detroit Lions, he ran for 66 yards and a touchdown. He finished the preseason with 200 rushing yards and three touchdowns. He was waived by the Patriots on August 31, 2019.

Detroit Lions

He was signed to the Detroit Lions practice squad on September 12, 2019. He was later released that same day, and was resigned by the Lions on September 18, 2019. He was released by the Lions again on September 24, 2019.

DC Defenders

Brossette was signed by the DC Defenders of the XFL during mini-camp in December 2019. He rushed for 75 yards and his first XFL touchdown against the Los Angeles Wildcats on February 23, 2020. He finished the season with 87 rushing yards. He had his contract terminated when the league suspended operations on April 10, 2020.

References

External links
LSU Tigers bio

1996 births
Living people
Players of American football from Baton Rouge, Louisiana
African-American players of American football
American football running backs
Louisiana State University Laboratory School alumni
LSU Tigers football players
New England Patriots players
Detroit Lions players
DC Defenders players
21st-century African-American sportspeople